Events in the year 1801 in Norway.

Incumbents
Monarch: Christian VII

Events
 1 February – The first complete and reliable census was held in Norway: 883,603 inhabitants in Norway.
 2 April – War of the Second Coalition – First Battle of Copenhagen: The British Royal Navy, under Admiral Sir Hyde Parker, forces the Royal Dano-Norwegian Navy to accept an armistice. Vice-Admiral Horatio Nelson leads the main attack, deliberately disregarding his commander's signal to withdraw. He is created a Viscount on 19 May; Denmark-Norway is forced to withdraw from the Second League of Armed Neutrality.

Arts and literature
 Det Dramatiske Selskab in Drammen was founded.

Births
4 February – Lauritz Dorenfeldt Jenssen, businessperson (d.1859)

Full date unknown
Hother Erich Werner Bøttger, politician (d.1857)
Olea Crøger, folk music collector (d.1855)
Jan Henrik Nitter Hansen, businessman and politician (d.1879)
Johan Frederik Thorne, businessperson and politician (d.1854)

Deaths
23 May - Jacob Nicolai Wilse, priest and meteorologist (born 1736)
21 July - Mathia Collett, merchant and businessperson (born 1737)

See also

References